Lytvyn is a Ukrainian-language equivalent of the Slavic surname Litvin, which means a resident of the Grand Duchy of Lithuania. It may refer to:

Dmytro Lytvyn (born 1996), Ukrainian football player
Oksana Lytvyn (born 1961), Ukrainian couturier and designer
Lytvyn brothers:
Volodymyr Lytvyn (born 1956), Ukrainian politician, Chairman of the Verkhovna Rada (parliament)
Mykola Lytvyn (born 1961), Director of the State Border Guard of Ukraine
Petro Lytvyn (born 1967), Ukrainian military general
 Yuriy Lytvyn (disambiguation), the name of several people

See also
 
Lytvyn Bloc, electoral block led by Volodymyr Lytvyn
Lytovchenko
Lytvynenko
Lytvynchuk
Lytvynovych
Lytwyn

 Ukrainian-language surnames
 Surnames of Lithuanian origin